Taz Douglas (born 11 February 1984) is a part-time Australian race driver. Douglas came 2nd at the Supercheap Auto Bathurst 1000 with James Moffat in 2014

Douglas was born in Frankston, Victoria, Australia. Having scored numerous karting titles in his junior years - including the Ford Kart Stars Series in 2000.

He returned to motorsport in 2005, making his Formula Ford debut in the Victorian Championship, finishing fourth.

In 2006, Douglas won the title and began working with the squad for HSV dealer team in V8 Supercars and testing their Commodore in the second half of the season.

In 2012, Taz Douglas was called up to drive for Lucas Dumbrell Motorsport as their full-time driver.

In 2013, Taz Douglas did not retain his full-time International V8 Supercars Championship seat at Lucas Dumbrell Motorsport. Douglas would return to the Dunlop Series where he had spent his time driving his own team prior to getting his main game call-up. Douglas would race with Image Racing in 2013 in the ex-Shane van Gisbergen, Stone Brothers Racing Ford FG Falcon. In 2013 Douglas will also make his fourth start in the V8 Supercars Endurance races, getting a call-up from Nissan Motosport to partner James Moffat in the Norton backed Nissan Altima.

Career results

Supercars Championship results

Complete Bathurst 1000 results

References 

 Australian Formula Ford
 Formula Ford Drivers

External links
 Tax Douglas profile at Racing Reference
 

1984 births
Formula Ford drivers
Living people
Racing drivers from Melbourne
Supercars Championship drivers
Nismo drivers
Kelly Racing drivers
People from Frankston, Victoria